The 1931–32 season was Madrid Football Club's 30th season in existence, and their 4th consecutive season in the Primera División. The club also played in the Campeonato Mancomunado Centro-Aragón (Central-Aragon Joint Championship) and the Copa del Rey. The establishment of the Second Spanish Republic in April 1931 caused Real Madrid Club de Fútbol to lose the title "Real" and the royal crown from their crest and badge, and Real Madrid went back to being named Madrid Football Club.

Madrid FC secured their first Primera División title, finishing the league unbeaten.

Friendlies

Competitions

Overview

La Liga

League table

Matches

Campeonato Mancomunado Centro-Aragón

Matches

Copa del Rey

Round of 16

Notes

1931-1932
Spanish football clubs 1931–32 season
Spanish football championship-winning seasons